The Edinburgh Science Triangle (EST) is a multi-disciplinary partnership between universities, research institutes, the National Health Service, science parks, the national economic development agency Scottish Enterprise, and central and local government in Edinburgh and neighbouring council areas. The three points of the "triangle" are Livingston in West Lothian, Musselburgh in East Lothian, and the Easter Bush campus in Midlothian.

The collaborative project aims to attract new indigenous and inward investment, and to build a professional scientific community based on academic research and commercial enterprises. The target sectors for the project are the life sciences, informatics, micro- and optoelectronics and energy.

The Edinburgh Science Triangle was launched by Jim Wallace, the Deputy First Minister, in September 2004, at the Roslin BioCentre in Midlothian. It is a member of Edinburgh's Local Investment Partnership, which includes the City of Edinburgh Council, Edinburgh Chamber of Commerce, Scottish Development International and Scottish Enterprise. Scottish Development International promotes the Edinburgh Science Triangle abroad.

Funding to promote and support the Edinburgh Science Triangle comes from Scottish Enterprise, the European Regional Development Fund, the City of Edinburgh, Midlothian and West Lothian councils, and the participating science parks.

Participants

Easter Bush Campus

 Moredun Research Institute
 Roslin Institute
 Royal (Dick) School of Veterinary Studies (the Dick Vet)
 Scottish Agricultural College
 EPCC's Advanced Computing Facility

Hospitals
 Lauriston Building, Edinburgh
 Liberton Hospital, Edinburgh
 Princess Alexandra Eye Pavilion, Edinburgh
 Royal Hospital for Sick Children, Edinburgh
 Royal Infirmary of Edinburgh
 Royal Victoria Hospital, Edinburgh
 St John's Hospital, Livingston, West Lothian
 Western General Hospital, Edinburgh

Incubators

 Edinburgh Research and Innovation, University of Edinburgh
 Scottish Microelectronics Centre

Research institutes
 Institute for Astronomy, School of Physics and Astronomy, University of Edinburgh
 Institute for Stem Cell Research
 Moredun Research Institute
 Queen's Medical Research Institute
 Roslin Institute
 Scottish Manufacturing Institute

Science parks

 Alba Innovation Centre, a Scottish Enterprise project in Livingston, West Lothian, focussed on micro- and opto-electronics and managed by Innovation Centres Scotland.  It is a subsidiary of Lanarkshire Enterprise Services.
 BioCampus, Midlothian, focussed on biomanufacturing
 Edinburgh BioQuarter, focussed on life sciences
 Edinburgh Technopole, Midlothian, a general science park
 Heriot-Watt Research Park, Edinburgh, a general science park
 Pentlands Science Park, Midlothian, focussed on animal health and welfare
 Roslin BioCentre, Midlothian, focussed on animal health science

Technology transfer organisations
 Artificial Intelligence Applications Institute
 Edinburgh Technology Transfer Centre
 Heriot-Watt Technology and Research Services
 Moredun Scientific
 Roslin Cellab

Universities

 Edinburgh Napier University
 Heriot-Watt University, Edinburgh
 Queen Margaret University, Musselburgh, East Lothian
 University of Edinburgh

References

See also
 Silicon Glen

Organisations based in Midlothian
Organisations supported by the Scottish Government
NHS Scotland
Science and technology in Scotland
Higher education in Scotland
Science parks in the United Kingdom
Research institutes in Scotland
Local government in Scotland
Economy of Edinburgh
2004 establishments in Scotland
2004 in science
Government agencies established in 2004
Scientific organisations based in the United Kingdom
High-technology business districts in the United Kingdom
Information technology places
Science and technology in Edinburgh
Research institutes in Edinburgh